The Geneva Frequency Plan of 1975 (aka "The Final Acts of the Regional Administrative LF/MF Broadcasting Conference (Regions 1 and 3) Geneva, 1975" or simply "GE75")  is the internationally agreed frequency plan which was drawn up to implement the provisions of the Final Acts of the Regional Administrative LF/MF Broadcasting Conference (Regions 1 and 3) held in Geneva, Switzerland, in 1975. It covers radio broadcasting in the long and medium wave bands outside the Americas (separate agreements being in place for North and South America).

The plan was drawn up under the auspices of the World Administrative Radio Conference (WARC) of the International Telecommunication Union (ITU) with the assistance of the European Broadcasting Union (EBU/UER).

The Geneva plan replaced the 1948 Copenhagen plan.  It became necessary because of the large number of broadcasting stations in these frequency ranges leading to ever more mutual interference (many countries had refused to ratify the Copenhagen plan and compliance was patchy even among those which had). The Geneva plan entered into force on 23 November 1978 and although its intended lifespan was only until 1989, it is still valid (with small modification by mutual coordination between countries) today, and compliance has been far more widespread.

Most existing European radio stations were required to change their broadcasting frequencies following implementation of the plan. In most cases the changes were slight (less than five kilohertz) but were more drastic in some cases, particularly in the United Kingdom, where all BBC national stations moved to a new wavelength or band. However the increased number of radio services and reduction (in most cases) of interference to radio signals (particularly at nighttime) was considered by most broadcasters to be worth the initial inconvenience.

As a result of the plan most medium wave (and later longwave) stations outside North and South America operate on exact multiples of 9 kHz; the sum of all digits of the frequency will be 9 or a multiple of 9 (see 9#Mathematics).

Predecessors to the GE75 Plan
 Geneva 1925 (effective 14 November 1926) 10 kHz spacings on MW;
 Brussels 1928 (effective 13 January 1929) 9 kHz spacings on MW (10 kHz above 1000 kHz);
 Prague 1929 (effective 30 June 1929) "European Radio-electric Conference of Prague 1929" 9 kHz spacings on MW (10 kHz above 1400 kHz);
 Madrid/Lucerne 1932 (effective 15 January 1934 |pages12-13) "Lucerne Convention European Wavelength Plan" Mostly 9 kHz spacings but not harmonic multiples;
 Montreux 1939 (was to be effective 1940 but never implemented due to World War II );;
 Copenhagen 1948 (effective 15 March 1950) "European LW/MW Conference Copenhagen 1948 (European broadcasting convention)" Mostly 9 kHz (8 kHz above 1529 kHz 7, 8, and 9 kHz on LW) spacings but not harmonic multiples—offset 1 kHz on MW and (generally) 2 kHz on LW.

See also
AM radio
Mediumwave
MW DX
Longwave
North American Regional Broadcasting Agreement

References

External links
 GE75 Final Acts (including original plan) (PDF format)
 
 
 

Bandplans
Telecommunications treaties
1975 in radio
Treaties concluded in 1975
Treaties of the People's Socialist Republic of Albania
Treaties of Andorra
Treaties of Bahrain
Treaties of the Byelorussian Soviet Socialist Republic
Treaties of Belgium
Treaties of Bosnia and Herzegovina
Treaties of Botswana
Treaties of the People's Republic of Bulgaria
Treaties of Burkina Faso
Treaties of Cameroon
Treaties of the People's Republic of China
Treaties of Ivory Coast
Treaties of Croatia
Treaties of the Czech Republic
Treaties of Denmark
Treaties of Egypt
Treaties of the Derg
Treaties of Fiji
Treaties of Finland
Treaties of France
Treaties of West Germany
Treaties of Greece
Treaties of the Hungarian People's Republic
Treaties of Iceland
Treaties of India
Treaties of Ireland
Treaties of Italy
Treaties of Japan
Treaties of Jordan
Treaties of South Korea
Treaties of Liechtenstein
Treaties of Luxembourg
Treaties of Malaysia
Treaties of Malawi
Treaties of Monaco
Treaties of the Mongolian People's Republic
Treaties of Montenegro
Treaties of Morocco
Treaties of the People's Republic of Mozambique
Treaties of Myanmar
Treaties of Nauru
Treaties of Nepal
Treaties of the Netherlands
Treaties of New Zealand
Treaties of Norway
Treaties of Oman
Treaties of Papua New Guinea
Treaties of the Polish People's Republic
Treaties of the Socialist Republic of Romania
Treaties of the Soviet Union
Treaties of Senegal
Treaties of Serbia and Montenegro
Treaties of Sierra Leone
Treaties of Singapore
Treaties of Slovakia
Treaties of Slovenia
Treaties of Spain
Treaties of Sweden
Treaties of Switzerland
Treaties of North Macedonia
Treaties of Tonga
Treaties of the United Kingdom
Treaties of the Holy See
Treaties of Czechoslovakia
Treaties of East Germany
Treaties of Yugoslavia